Walker Dabney Stuart III (born November 4, 1937 Richmond, Virginia) is an American poet.

He graduated from Davidson College, with a BA in English in 1960, and from Harvard University, with an MA in English in 1962.

He is professor emeritus of English at Washington and Lee University.
His work appeared in Poetry, Shenandoah, Southern Review, and Yale Review.

Awards
1987 Guggenheim Fellowship

Works

Poetry
Tables, Pinyon Publishing, 2009, 
Family preserve: poems, University of Virginia Press, 2005, 
The man who loves Cézanne: poems, LSU Press, 2003, 
Settlers: poems, Louisiana State University Press, 1999, 
Long gone: poems, Louisiana State University Press, 1996, 
Light years: new and selected poems, Louisiana State University Press, 1994, 
Narcissus dreaming: poems, Louisiana State University Press, 1990, 
Don't look back: poems, Louisiana State University Press, 1987, 
Common ground: poems, Louisiana State University Press, 1982, 
Round and round: a triptych : poems, Louisiana University Press, 1977, 
The other hand: poems, Louisiana State University Press, 1974, 
A particular place; poems, Knopf, 1969

Stories
No visible means of support: stories, University of Missouri Press, 2001, 
The way to Cobbs Creek: stories, University of Missouri Press, 1997,

Criticism
Nabokov: The Dimensions of Parody, Louisiana State University Press, 1978,

References

External links
"Dabney Stuart", Southern writers: a new biographical dictionary, Editors Joseph M. Flora, Amber Vogel, Bryan Albin Giemza, LSU Press, 2006, 

American male poets
1937 births
Writers from Richmond, Virginia
Davidson College alumni
Harvard University alumni
Washington and Lee University faculty
Living people